Slobodan Janković may refer to:
 Boban Janković (Slobodan Janković, 1963–2006), Yugoslavian basketball player
 Slobodan Janković (footballer, born 1946), Yugoslavian/ Serbian midfielder
 Slobodan Janković (footballer, born 1981), Serbian football goalkeeper for Mladost Lučani
 Slobodan Janković (footballer born 1986), goalkeeper, currently playing for Serbian club FK Napredak Kruševac